Geir Holmsen (born 12 December 1956 in Oslo, Norway) is a Norwegian jazz musician, bassist, arranger and composer, and married 1983 to the singer Maj Britt Andersen. He participated in various bands connected to the jazz club Club 7 in Oslo, from the mid-1970s, including "Kråbøl", "Lotus" and "Chipahua". He is also known from "Jon Eberson Group" (1980–84), "Jazzpønkensemblet" (1982–85) and "Oslo Rhythm & Blues Ensemble" (1986–87).

Career 
Holmsen is educated at the Norges Musikkhøgskole, and did composition studies with Gunnar Sønstevold and Maj Sønstevold, now Professor of Music at the University of Agder (UiA).

In the 1970s he took part in jazz bands led by Terje Lie, Paul Weeden, Espen Rud and Ditlef Eckhoff.
In the 1980s, Holmsen was within Chipahua, Jon Eberson Group and Jazzpunkensemblet.
He is the composer of several of Maj Britt Andersen album releases, and productions of Folk er rare at Det Norske Teatret and Riksteatret. Holmsen has also been a board member of TONO.

Honors 
Spellemannprisen 1981, as member of Jon Ebserson Group
Gammleng-prisen 1996 in the studio class
TONO's Kardemommestipend 1990
Juliusprisen 1994
Teskjekjerringprisen 2001, with Maj Britt Andersen and Trond Brænne

Discography 
Albums (in selection)
1981: Jive Talking (CBS Records), with Jon Eberson Group
1984: One of These Mornings / My Funny Valentine (Philips Records), with Silje Nergaard
1986: Dansere I Natten (Kirkelig Kulturverksted), with Bjørn Eidsvåg
1986: Perfect Crime (Bahama Records), with Vindél
1986: Folk Er Rare! (Barneselskapet), with Maj Britt Andersen
1988: Vertigo (Kirkelig Kulturverksted), with Bjørn Eidsvåg
1991: Live at Rockefeller (Odin Records), with Jon Eberson's Jazzpunkensemblet
1992: Kjærtegn (Norsk Plateproduksjon), with Maj Britt Andersen
1994: Rippel Rappel (Grappa Music), with Maj Britt Andersen
1997: På Svai (Norsk Plateproduksjon), with Bjørn Eidsvåg
1998: Meridians (Bahama Records), with Torbjørn Sunde
2003: Kong Lavring (Pan Records), with Kong Lavring
2005: Rock Vs. Opera (Grappa Music), with Dollie de Luxe
2006: Receita Para A Vida (Ipe Mundi Records), with Latini

References

External links 

Geir Holmsen Biography on Store Norske Leksikon

Norwegian Academy of Music alumni
Academic staff of the University of Agder
Norwegian bass guitarists
Norwegian male bass guitarists
Norwegian jazz composers
Musicians from Oslo
1956 births
Living people
Male jazz composers
Jazzpunkensemblet members